Yuraqqucha (Quechua yuraq white, qucha lake, "white lake",  hispanicized spelling Yuraccocha) is a lake in Peru. It is situated in the Junín Region, Jauja Province, Canchayllo District, east of Wich'iqucha. It belongs to the watershed of the Mantaro River. 

It is operated by Electroperu.

See also
List of lakes in Peru

References 

Lakes of Peru
Lakes of Junín Region
Dams in Peru
Buildings and structures in Junín Region